Vologdinella is a poorly known genus of extinct animals of uncertain classification with small cylindrical shells. The animals are known from Middle Cambrian fossils from a Paleozoic limestone in the Chingiz Mountains of Kazakhstan.

The genus was historically classified as a cephalopod, though it has since been removed from this group. Vologdinella bears superficial resemblance to the Early Cambrian Volborthella. In the same work establishing the former genus, the two genera were classified within their own families – Vologdinellidae and Volborthellidae, respectively – within the order Volborthellida. Volborthella was later included in Agmata, an extinct phylum proposed by the paleontologist and geologist . Vologdinella was also considered for inclusion in the Agmata, or in questionable synonymy with Volborthella, but a later study determined that the genus was not related to them.

See also
 Olenecoceras – another genus named by Balashov, also was formerly believed to be a cephalopod

References

Cambrian invertebrates
Enigmatic prehistoric animal genera
Monotypic prehistoric animal genera
Fossil taxa described in 1962